Haim Victor Gerson DSO, LdH (b. 1898—d. ?), code name Rene, was a Special Operations Executive agent during the Second World War. He organised the Vic escape line in France. Escape lines helped allied soldiers and airmen, SOE agents, and other people in danger to escape from Nazi-occupied Europe, usually by crossing the Pyrenees mountains into neutral Spain.

Early years 
Haim Victor Gerson was born in August 1898 in Southport, Lancashire, the son of a fabric merchant.

World War I
He joined the British army at the declaration of war and was sent to the Western Front In France and took part in the Battle of the Somme.

After the war, he went to Paris where he was a dealer in fine rugs and carpets. He married and had a son, however in the 1930s his wife died and his son was killed in a traffic accident. He then married Giliana Balmaceda, a Chilean-born actress.

World War II 
On 18 June 1940 four days before the signing of the armistice between Germany and a defeated France, the couple escaped to England where both joined the Special Operations Executive. In May 1941 Balmaceda was the first female SOE agent to be sent to France. She went to Vichy France, the southern, unoccupied part of France, and collected information and administrative documents used in France, such as ration cards, which could be reproduced in England for use by agents on clandestine missions in France.

First mission
On the night of the 6/7 September 1941 Gerson was parachuted from a Whitley bomber, along with five other agents and landed near the Le Cerisier farm of Auguste Chantraine, Mayor of Tendu. He travelled to Lyon and Marseille, where he assessed the possibility of organising subversive networks in cities. In October, he avoided arrest in Marseille as he was wary of the voice that gave him an appointment by phone, did not go there. He quickly left France and returned to London where he reported on his conclusions on the French willingness to resist the German occupation.

Second mission
He was sent back in the field to set up a safe escape route through France into Spain.

In Operation DELAY II Peter Churchill’s mission was to land four SOE agents on the French Riviera by submarine. On 26 February 1942 Churchill flew from Bristol to Gibraltar with two radio operators, Isidore Newman «Julien» for the URCHIN network and Edward Zeff «Matthieu» for the SPRUCE network, where they were joined by Marcel Clech «Bastien», radio operator for the AUTOGIRO network, and Victor Gerson «René», an SOE agent on a special mission to organise the VIC Escape Line. They travelled in HM Submarine P 42 “Unbroken” to Antibes where on the night of 21 April 1942 Churchill took Newman and Zeff and their radios to the shore by canoe, and led them to their contact Dr Élie Lévy. Churchill then returned to the submarine and dropped off Clech and Gerson by canoe at Pointe d’Agay near Fréjus

Gerson and Clech went to Lyon where they met with SOE agent and American Virginia Hall. Gerson gradually built up an escape network to Spain with Lazare Rachline (Lucien Rachet) and Georges Levin, with Thérèse Mitrani in Lyon, René Feraggi in Marseille, and Jacques Mitterrand in Paris. He also installed groups in Perpignan and Montpellier.
Gerson entrusted Rachline to exfiltrate the eleven SOE agents after they escaped from Mauzac prison on 16 July 1942 and made their way through Spain to England.  The escaping agents included Michael Trotobas and Georges Bégué.

On 19/20 August 1943 Gerson returned by plane to England, and on 14 September returned to France in a Hudson bomber which landed in France and was met by Henri Déricourt.

Operating rules 
Gerson imposed strict rules on his members within the VIC escape line: 

Despite the circuit being penetrated three times by the Gestapo in June and October 1943 and January 1944, in which some members were arrested, the group was able to continue its activities.

Gerson was arrested once while travelling on a train between Paris and Lyons, however his cover story was so convincing he was soon released.

During the war he was infiltrated into France six times.

Post war 
After the war he returned to Paris and resumed his activity in fine rugs and carpets.

Recognition

Distinctions 
 United Kingdom: Distinguished Service Order (DSO),  Member of the Order of the British Empire (MBE)
France: Chevalier de la Légion d'honneur

Monument 
 A stone monument at Le Cerisier, Tendu (Indre) commemorates the clandestine parachute landing on 6 September 1941.

Road name
 An avenue in Issy-les-Moulineaux (Hauts-de-Seine) is named after him.

References

External sources 
MRD Foot, English in the Resistance. British Secret Service of Action (SOE) in France 1940-1944, 
MRD Foot, Six Faces of Courage, Eyre Methuen, 1978
Sir Brooks Richards, Secret Flotillas. Clandestine links in France and North Africa, 1940-1944.
EG Boxshall, Chronology of SOE operations with the resistance in France during World War II, 1960.
The National Archives HS 9/575/4

1890s births
British Special Operations Executive personnel
Companions of the Distinguished Service Order
Chevaliers of the Légion d'honneur
Year of death missing